Group E of the 2002 FIFA World Cup took place on 11 June 2002. Germany won the group, and advanced to the second round, along with the Republic of Ireland. Cameroon and Saudi Arabia failed to advance.

Standings

Germany advanced to play Paraguay (runner-up of Group B) in the round of 16.
Republic of Ireland advanced to play Spain (winner of Group B) in the round of 16.

Matches
All times local (UTC+9)

Republic of Ireland vs Cameroon

Germany vs Saudi Arabia

Germany vs Republic of Ireland

Cameroon vs Saudi Arabia

Cameroon vs Germany

Saudi Arabia vs Republic of Ireland

External links
 Results

E
Group
Group
Saudi Arabia at the 2002 FIFA World Cup
Cameroon at the 2002 FIFA World Cup